Gordon Smith (born 21 June 1954) is a former Australian wrestler. He competed in the 1976 Summer Olympics in Montreal, Canada, where he was eliminated after two matches. Smith represented Australia in three World Championships, one in 1971 and two in 1979, in the Intermediate and Senior Grades. He held the title of Australian Champion from 1968 to 1979 

He later worked as a Personal Development, Health and Physical Education (PDHPE) teacher, in the position of Head Teacher PDHPE at Baulkham Hills High School in Sydney, Australia until 2014 when he retired.

References

1954 births
Living people
Australian schoolteachers
Olympic wrestlers of Australia
Wrestlers at the 1976 Summer Olympics
Australian male sport wrestlers